Lac St. Cyr is a lake in the County of St. Paul No. 19, Alberta. The lake is near the town of St. Paul and since 1951 has been used as a source of water. In 1978, seasonal pumping of water from the North Saskatchewan River into the lake was begun to address a fall in the water level.

References 

St. Cyr
County of St. Paul No. 19